Stockton Bend is a city in Hood County, Texas, United States. It was incorporated in May 2004 originally as "Brazos Bend", and is located along the main stem of the Brazos River. As of the 2020 census it had a population of 380. The city is part of the Granbury, Texas Micropolitan Statistical Area.  The name was recently changed to "Stockton Bend".

Geography

The city is in northeast-central Hood County, on both sides of the Brazos River where it is impounded as Lake Granbury. There is no bridge within the city limits connecting the two parts of the city. The majority of the city is on the west side of the river, occupying the inside of the Stockton Bend river attribute.

Education
The Granbury Independent School District serves area students.

External Links
Information on the city government is available at the Texas Municipal League

References

Cities in Texas
Cities in Hood County, Texas
Granbury micropolitan area